Marius Barnard and John-Laffnie de Jager were the defending champions, but Barnard did not participate this year.  de Jager partnered Johan de Beer, losing in the first round.

Jacco Eltingh and Paul Haarhuis won the title, defeating Jan Apell and Jonas Björkman by retirement after winning 6–1 in the first set.

Seeds

Draw

Draw

References

External links
Draw

Kremlin Cup
Kremlin Cup